Jean-Louis Ducarme is a French sound engineer. He was nominated for an Academy Award in the category Best Sound for the film Sorcerer.

Selected filmography
 Sorcerer (1977)

References

External links

Year of birth missing (living people)
Living people
French audio engineers